Hughey may refer to:

People
 John Hughey, American musician
 Jim Hughey, a pitcher for the Milwaukee Brewers
 Matthew Hughey, associate professor of sociology at the University of Connecticut

Places
 Hughey, Wisconsin, United States

See also
 Huey (disambiguation)
 Hugh (disambiguation)
 Hughes (disambiguation)